Al-Madinah School is an Islamic school located in Brooklyn, NY.  It serves its student from Pre-K to 12th grades. Al-Madinah School teaches about Islam.

See also
 Islam in the United States

References

External links
 

Islamic schools in New York (state)
Private high schools in Brooklyn
Private elementary schools in Brooklyn
Private middle schools in Brooklyn
Educational institutions established in 2000
2000 establishments in New York City